Ina Kleber (later Buttgereit, born 29 September 1964 in Greiz) is a German former swimmer who competed in the 1980 Summer Olympics.

References

1964 births
Living people
People from Greiz
German female swimmers
Female backstroke swimmers
Olympic swimmers of East Germany
Swimmers at the 1980 Summer Olympics
Olympic silver medalists for East Germany
Medalists at the 1980 Summer Olympics
World Aquatics Championships medalists in swimming
European Aquatics Championships medalists in swimming
Olympic silver medalists in swimming
Sportspeople from Thuringia